Ralph Duren May (February 17, 1972 – October 6, 2017) was an American stand-up comedian and actor, known for his extensive touring and comedy specials on multiple media platforms.

Early life
May was born in Chattanooga, Tennessee, and raised in Clarksville, Arkansas. He was the youngest of four children.

At age 17 he won a contest to open for Sam Kinison, whom he considered his idol. May explained, "The joke that he liked the best was talking about the drummer (Rick Allen) from Def Leppard. 'After he lost his arm, I felt bad about listening to him. Not that I'm prejudiced against handicapped people, it's just the fact that if I applauded, it was insulting to him, like "Ha! Ha! Look at my use of two hands!"' Kinison suggested that May move to Houston to further develop his comedy routine. May graduated from the High School for the Performing and Visual Arts.

Career
In 2003, May was chosen to participate in the first season of Last Comic Standing. He finished in second place in the competition, with Dat Phan winning first place. Afterwards, May appeared in comedy shows, such as The Wayne Brady Show and The Tonight Show with Jay Leno. In 2005, he was the only white comedian on The Big Black Comedy Show, which also featured Mo'Nique, Rodman, and Vince Morris.

In 2005, May released his first comedy album Just Correct. He later recorded four Comedy Central specials titled Girth of a Nation (2006), Prime Cut (2007), Austin-tatious (2008), and Too Big To Ignore (2012), as well as two Netflix specials titled Imperfectly Yours (2013) and Unruly (2015). He appeared in For Da Love of Money. May also performed at the "Gathering of the Juggalos 2012".

Personal life
On July 3, 2005, May married comedian Lahna Turner. The couple had two children: a daughter born in September 2007 and a son born in June 2009. The couple filed for divorce in October 2015 and sought joint custody of their children, but their separation could never be finalized.

May struggled with obesity throughout his life. After a bout with viral pneumonia on a cruise in October 2011, May lost 40 pounds. The following month, he suffered a nearly-fatal pulmonary embolism after contracting serious pneumonia on a cruise ship, where a blood clot from his leg became lodged in an artery.

In many interviews May discussed his grandmother, whom he credited with helping to care for him and his siblings when they were children. Speaking to the Arkansas Times in 2012, May said, "Thank goodness for my grandmother, she was a hell of a woman. She was really beneficial, she kept us in a stature way above our means and made sure we were taken care of as far as clean clothes and shoes." His Facebook bio also references his grandmother. "When I was a kid, my grandmother taught me how to crochet and how to quilt, and that's kind of how I do an act. I have one-liners, I have dirty jokes, but I also have long stories that are 10 or 20 minutes long and the laughs come every eight seconds. It's a different set. And it's a different life than most people have led."

In an interview with the Arkansas Times in 2012, he discussed growing up in Clarksville, shedding light on some of the hardships he faced. He shared, "It was a hard life growing up. It was a similar story to a lot of people in Arkansas. My mom was a florist. I'm the youngest of four. My father and mother hated each other, and they took it out on us. She'd sue him for not paying child support, then he didn't pay, and that ended up costing us a lot."

In 2013, May and his wife Turner started a podcast together called Perfect 10.

His memoir, This Might Get a Little Heavy, was published posthumously in December 2017.

Death
On October 6, 2017, May went into cardiac arrest and died. May had been battling pneumonia for several weeks and as a result, had canceled shows over the previous month. He was 45 years old. It was later published that, hours before his death, May was scheduled to do a meet-and-greet after his final performance at Harrah's in Las Vegas around midnight, but he had already shown signs of his deteriorating condition.

Filmography

Discography

References

External links
 
 
 
 

1972 births
2017 deaths
20th-century American comedians
21st-century American comedians
American male film actors
American male television actors
American podcasters
American stand-up comedians
Deaths from pneumonia in Nevada
High School for the Performing and Visual Arts alumni
Male actors from Arkansas
Male actors from Tennessee
Participants in American reality television series
People from Chattanooga, Tennessee
People from Clarksville, Arkansas